Barren River Lake is a , reservoir in Kentucky created by the U.S. Army Corps of Engineers in 1964 by impounding the Barren River. The lake occupies parts of Allen, Barren, and Monroe counties.

The Barren River Lake Dam is an earthen dam, 146 feet high and 3970 feet long at its crest.  The U.S. Army Corps of Engineers is responsible for operation and maintenance of the project, and responsible for protection of the resource. A small segment of the property owned by the U.S. Army Corps of Engineers is leased to Barren River Lake State Resort Park and lies along a section of shoreline in Barren County.

Islands
The lake has three large islands.

In the widest part of the lake, there are two large islands, each about one square mile in size. And another smaller island near the main boat ramp and camp-site.

There is also another, which is sometimes partly connected to the surrounding land, but sometimes surrounded by lake water, depending on water levels.

References

External links 
 Barren River Lake, Louisville District, U.S. Army Corps of Engineers

Reservoirs in Kentucky
1964 establishments in Kentucky
Protected areas of Allen County, Kentucky
Protected areas of Barren County, Kentucky
Protected areas of Monroe County, Kentucky
Dams in Kentucky
Dams completed in 1964
United States Army Corps of Engineers dams
Bodies of water of Allen County, Kentucky
Bodies of water of Barren County, Kentucky
Bodies of water of Monroe County, Kentucky
Lake